Esi Lufo (born 10 September 2001) is an Albanian footballer who plays as a forward for League1 British Columbia club Rivers FC and the Albania women's national team.

University career
In 2020, she had been set to attend the University of Charleston and play for the women's soccer team, but ultimately did not play.

In 2023, she moved to Canada to attend Thompson Rivers University, where she will play for the women's soccer team.

Club career
Lufo began her senior career with Kinostudio in the Albanian Women's National Championship, where she played for three years.

Afterwards, she joined Tirana.

In 2019, she joined Vllaznia, the top club in the Albanian league.

In 2023, she joined Rivers FC in League1 British Columbia.

International career
She made her debut with the Albania U19 team in a friendly against Montenegro U19.

She scored her first senior international goal against Armenia in a 5-0 World Cup qualifying victory.

External links
Esi Lufo at Albanian Football Association

References

2001 births
Living people
Footballers from Tirana
Albanian footballers
Albanian women's footballers
Women's association football forwards
KFF Vllaznia Shkodër players
Albania women's international footballers
KF Tirana players
Rivers FC players